Jhangra is a small town and one of the 51 Union councils of Abbottabad District in Khyber-Pakhtunkhwa province of Pakistan. It is located in the southwest of the district. The popular language spoken is Hindko.

Jahangra Dam, which is being constructed around 3 km away from Jhangra Village, will benefit the residents of Kashka, Jhangra and Mohra Mohri Village and help meet their agricultural requirements and other water based needs.

Subdivisions
The Union Council of Jhangra is administratively subdivided into the following areas: Chamba, Darooni Maira, Havelian Village, Jhangra, Kalu Maira, Mala, Nowshera, Sultanpur. Kashka, Pungran, Wazeera and Ratidheri  .  

Jhangra is a very old village where before the Partition of Indo-Pak, only Hindus, Sikhs, and Muslims lived, but after the Partition in 1947, all non-Muslims left this area.

References

Union councils of Abbottabad District
Populated places in Abbottabad District

fr:Jhangra